Suffolk County may refer to:

 Suffolk County, Massachusetts, United States
 Suffolk County, New York, United States
 Suffolk, a county of England

See also
 Suffolk County Community College, New York
 Suffolk, Virginia, an independent city in Virginia